O-Bi, O-Ba: The End of Civilization is a 1985 Polish post-apocalyptic drama film written and directed by Piotr Szulkin.

Starring Jerzy Stuhr and Krystyna Janda, the film takes place in a post-apocalyptic future where humans live in an isolated vault which is falling apart. Their only grain of hope lies in a vessel known as The Ark which is said to be on its way to rescue them; however the existence of The Ark is a myth planted by the main character, whose profession is to ensure that the morale is maintained.

Cast
 Jerzy Stuhr as Soft
 Krystyna Janda as Gea
 Mariusz Dmochowski as millionaire
 Kalina Jędrusik as millionaire's wife
 Marek Walczewski as Soft's boss
 Jan Nowicki as engineer
 Henryk Bista as chubby
 Leon Niemczyk as well kept
 Krzysztof Majchrzak as man in freezer
 Stanisław Igar as craftsman
 Mariusz Benoit as doctor
 Włodzimierz Musiał as Kraft

Release
The film premiered in Poland on 28 January 1985. It was shown at the Polish Film Festival in Gdynia where Andrzej Kowalczyk won the prize for Best Production Design for his work on the film. The Polish DVD was released in December 2003 as part of a box set with two other Szulkin films, The War of the Worlds: Next Century and Ga-ga: Glory to the Heroes.

Reception

Kim Newman found the movie to be a serious, respectful treatment of its subject.

References

External links
 

1985 films
1980s Polish-language films
1980s science fiction drama films
Polish science fiction drama films
Polish post-apocalyptic films
Films directed by Piotr Szulkin
1985 drama films